Itjtawy  (full Egyptian name Amenemhat-itj-tawy — "Amenemhat, Seizer of the Two Lands"), is the name of the royal city founded as a new capital by Twelfth Dynasty Egyptian King Amenemhat I, who ruled from approximately 1991 BC to 1962 BC, during year 20 of his reign. As yet, the exact location of the royal city remains unidentified. Itjtawy is known to have been located in the Faiyum region and documentation exists that its cemeteries were located at Lisht, el-Lahun, and Dahshur. 

Relocation of the capital may have been a strategic move. The site for Itjtawy may have been chosen for its proximity to the source of Asiatic incursions into Egypt, in order to help prevent further attacks.

See also
 List of ancient Egyptian towns and cities
 List of historical capitals of Egypt

References

Populated places established in the 2nd millennium BC
Cities in ancient Egypt
Former populated places in Egypt
Lost ancient cities and towns
Former capitals of Egypt